Never Grow Old is a 2019 Revisionist Western film written and directed by Ivan Kavanagh. It stars Emile Hirsch, Déborah François, John Cusack, Danny Webb, Tim Ahern and Sam Louwyck. Saban Films released the film on March 15.

Plot

An undertaker (Emile Hirsch) enters church with a gun.  A shot is heard after some Bible verse is read attending funeral service.  He then attends a church service where the preacher claims that the congregation regrets banning alcohol, gambling and prostitution in order to make it a "Christian" town.  After church the man talks with his friend Ed who offers to babysit his kids if he ever needs.

The man and his family enter a store where his son asks if he wants a gun, to which he replies he has a rifle.  Meanwhile, a strange man enters and grunts aggressively at the storekeeper and stares at the man's wife.  Back at home, the man and his wife discuss how they never made it to California (their goal) and the man wishes to move on now that the "Christian" town has quieted down.  His wife refuses to leave.

In the middle of the night, three men approach and ask for a man named Bill Crabtree.  Though he gives the men directions, they demand that he go with them.  He takes the men to Bill's wife's house because Bill left town.  The man reveals that he is a bounty hunter looking for Bill.  Afterward, he asks to be taken to the saloon where he learns that the preacher demanded the innkeeper stop serving alcohol or he would burn the saloon down.  Over a drink, the men introduce themselves as Dutch Albert (John Cusack), Dumb Dumb (whose tongue is cut out) and Sicily, an Italian man who does not speak English. Introducing himself as Patrick Tate, an Irish immigrant.  Dutch claims that he understands how it feels to be an outsider like Patrick, an Irish Catholic.  Since the innkeeper does not have any food, the men return to Patrick's house where his wife, Audrey, makes a meal for them.  Dumb Dumb (the man from the store) leers at her.

After the meal, Dutch returns to the innkeeper and buys his hotel to turn it back into a saloon.  One month later, it is in full swing with gambling and whores.  The innkeeper (Jim Emmett) goes to get Patrick because a man "accidentally" died in the saloon.  The sheriff is suspicious, but everyone is silent when asked what happened.  At the funeral, the preacher accuses the sheriff of dereliction and demands justice.

That night, Dutch wakes Patrick and requests two coffins.  He takes Patrick to a dugout hole where he kills Bill Crabtree and one other man.  Patrick is beginning to make more money than usual due to the string of deaths.

At the saloon, Dutch cleans out a young man in cards who cannot pay his debt.  When Dutch refuses to let him leave, he pulls a gun, so Dutch kills him.  He claims to have killed the boy in self-defense, and no one says otherwise.  Everyone hears the gunshots across the street in the church and goes to see the body; the sheriff is increasingly agitated with Dutch but can do nothing.  Later, back at the store, Dumb Dumb follows Audrey inside and touches her face.  He grunts unintelligibly but appears to say "I love you" before leaving in shame.  When Audrey tells Patrick, he claims no harm will come to her.

Mrs. Crabtree goes to see Dutch at the saloon and offers to work as a whore because she is starving.  Dutch says he will take her and the daughter, but not her alone, as whores.  At Patrick's house, a wagon goes by and a couple claims they are headed to California.  They ask where the saloon is.  Shortly after leaving, Patrick hears gunshots, and finds the man dead in the street, presumably killed by either Dumb Dumb or Sicily.  After preparing the body, he gives his children candy and his wife a new dress, but she refuses because it is fancy and she will look out of place.  Offended, he goes into town with his friend and has a drink in the saloon.  He has a tense encounter with Dutch, but a shot is heard upstairs - Mrs. Crabtree's daughter couldn't handle being a whore and shoots the man who paid for her.

Patrick is commissioned to build a gallows to hang the girl, and his wife says if he does it he is guilty for her death.  They argue about how they have no place in the village, but Patrick wants to stay because of the money he is making off of the murders.  The next day, the girl is hanged.  Dumb Dumb follows Audrey home and stalks her into the back yard, brandishing a knife, but before he can get to her Patrick comes up behind him and strangles him, hiding the body in the hanged girl's coffin.  Now realizing the true depths of his depravity, Patrick agrees to leave with Audrey the next day.

That night, the preacher awakes and takes a cask of oil across the street and sets the saloon ablaze.  Dutch kills him and the sheriff who comes to his defense.  Patrick takes up the sheriff's gun but walks away from the encounter.  The next day, while he buries the two, Sicily is sent to kill Audrey.  She hides the children and readies Patrick's rifle and when Sicily enters, shoots his arm.  They fight and she stabs him in the stomach.  She takes one of his guns and they shoot each other.  Patrick's children retrieve him from the graveyard and he returns home.  He asks Ed to take care of his family if he does not come back.

Patrick retrieves his money from its hiding place and spends it all on a blunderbuss and pistol.  He loads the blunderbuss with nails and two silver coins, which he puts on the dead people's eyes.  He enters the church as seen in the first scene, where he finds Dutch and Jim Emmett.  Dutch realizes Patrick is now full of only hate, and draws on him.  Patrick shoots  the blunderbuss into Dutch, who shoots him in the gut, then turns his pistol on Jim, killing him.  He walks home and sees his son on the porch, who asks if he is dying.  He tells his son that he loves him, his sister and mother and to go get Ed.  Patrick remains on the porch and presumably dies.

Cast
 Emile Hirsch as Patrick Tate
 Déborah François as Audrey Tate
 John Cusack as Dutch Albert
 Danny Webb as Preacher Pike
 Tim Ahern as Sheriff Parker
 Sam Louwyck as Dumb-Dumb
  Camille Pistone  as Sicily
 Antonia Campbell-Hughes as Maria Pike
 Paul Reid as Ed
 Blake Berris as Fred
 Anne Coesens as Mrs. Crabtree
 Paul Ronan as Bill Crabtree
 Manon Capelle as Emily Crabtree

Production
In December 2017, it was announced Emile Hirsch, John Cusack, Deborah Francois, Antonia Campbell-Hughes, Paul Ronan, Danny Webb had joined the cast of the film, with Ivan Kavanagh directing from a screenplay he wrote. In an interview published on Cineuropa prior to its US release, Ivan Kavanagh told Davide Abbatescianni that his main inspiration when writing were ”the frontier photographs from the 1850s onwards. The hardship on the people’s faces was startlingly apparent, and when you listen to the hymns they sang at the time, they are about hardship, the misery of life, and how life will be better on the other side, in Heaven. It is a very sobering and moving view of the founding of America, and of the immigrant experience. I tried to get some of that into the film, as well as paying homage to the westerns I loved as a child.”

Release
In February 2018, Saban Films acquired distribution rights to the film. It was released in North America on March 15, 2019.

Reception 
Based on eight reviews, Metacritic rated it 65/100, which it labels "generally favorable reviews".

References

External links
 
 

2019 films
American drama films
Films about capital punishment
Irish drama films
Luxembourgian drama films
English-language Irish films
English-language Luxembourgian films
Films set in 1849
Saban Films films
2019 drama films
2010s English-language films
2010s American films